Yeh Jo Mohabbat Hai is a dramatic love story, releasing in India and other countries on 3 August 2012.

Cast 
 Aditya Samanta as Karan
 Nazia Hussain as Karishma
 Amita Nagia
 Rati Agnihotri as Mamta
 Farida Jalal
 Mukesh Tiwari
 Anuradha Patel
 Preet Kaur Madhan
 Mohnish Behl
 Siddharth Arora
 Aham Sharma
 Manasvi Vyas

Soundtrack 
The soundtrack of Yeh Jo Mohabbat Hai  is composed by Anu Malik. The album consist of seven songs.

Track list

References

External links 
 Fun Rahi
 Saavn
 
 

2012 films
2010s Hindi-language films
2012 romantic drama films
Films scored by Anu Malik
Indian romantic drama films